Chukanlu (also Romanized as Chūkānlū and Chowkanloo) is a village in Takmaran Rural District, Sarhad District, Shirvan County, North Khorasan Province, Iran. At the 2006 census, its population was 283, in 67 families.

References 

Populated places in Shirvan County